Milton is the name of a tack or tenant farm on the island of South Uist in the Outer Hebrides, Scotland. It was on this tack that Jacobite heroine Flora MacDonald (1722-1790) was born and spent her childhood. A memorial dedicated to her stands at the remains of the township.

References

South Uist